"Dios nos libre del dinero" (stylized as "Dio$ No$ Libre del Dinero") is a song recorded by Spanish singer and songwriter Rosalía. It was released through Sony and Columbia Records alongside its A-track "Milionària". This two songs complete the two-side single "Fucking Money Man", released on 3 July 2019. The songs' release was supported by a 4:47-minute long music video directed by Bàrbara Farré which contains Rosalia singing along to both of the songs while participating in old television contests and then burning the money she has obtained out of it.

Background
The song was a surprise-release with a very little previous announcement by Rosalía. The singer recurred to the traditional paper press to announce on El País' 3 July edition that she would be releasing a new project titled "Fucking Money Man" that same day. A couple hours before the official release some streaming and music download platforms leaked that the project would be a two-side single with money as the main theme. The first song "Milionària" would be sung in the Catalan language, which is the singer's natal and main language, and "Dios Nos Libre del Dinero" would be sung in Spanish. The song contrasts its A-side which talks about dreaming about being a millionaire since the message behind "Dios Nos Libre del Dinero" is that money cannot buy everything.

Commercial performance 
The song was released on July 3, 2019 and debuted at number 86 on the PROMUSICAE chart with only one day tracking. The next week the song reached its peak position by charting on the twenty fourth position on that same chart. The song lasted on it for four weeks

Credits and personnel
Credits adapted from Tidal.

 Rosalía Vila – vocals, songwriting, composer, co-producer, miscellaneous production
 Pablo Díaz-Reixa – songwriting, composer, miscellaneous production,  recording engineering
 Chris Athens – master engineering
 Matt Tavares – miscellaneous production
 Jaycen Joshua – mixing engineering

Charts

References

2020 singles
2020 songs
Rosalía songs
Songs written by Rosalía
Spanish-language songs
Songs written by el Guincho